Arnold Huijgen (born 16 November 1978) is a Dutch theologian and professor of systematic theology at the Theological University of Apeldoorn.

Life 
He studied theology at the Theological University of Apeldoorn from 1997 to 2004. In 2011 he graduated at this university on the dissertation  Divine Accommodation in John Calvin's Theology. Analysis and Assessment . It concerns a study of the accommodation concept of John Calvin. Accommodation means that God, according to Calvin, in His revelation adapts to the comprehension of man.

In 2004 he became an assistant in education at Theological University of Apeldoorn and in 2008 he was assigned the position of university lecturer. From June 2007 to the end of 2013 he was minister at the Christian Reformed church in Genemuiden. He was appointed in 2014 as senior lecturer, his appointment as professor of systematic theology followed in November 2016.

Bibliography 
 Lezen en laten lezen. Gelovig omgaan met de Bijbel. Kokboekencentrum, Utrecht, 2019.
Herman J. Selderhuis & Arnold Huijgen (eds.), Calvinus Pastor Ecclesiae. Papers of the Eleventh International Congress on Calvin Research, Reformed Historical Theology 39 (Göttingen: Vandenhoeck & Ruprecht, 2016).
 ‘Practicing Gratitude. The Spirituality of Prayer in the Heidelberg Catechism’, in: Arnold Huijgen (ed.), The Spirituality of the Heidelberg Catechism. Papers of the International Conference on the Heidelberg Catechism Held in Apeldoorn 2013, Reformed Historical Theology 24 (Göttingen: Vandenhoeck & Ruprecht, 2015), 206–224.
 ‘Das Gebet im Heidelberger Katechismus’, in: A. Huijgen e.a. (eds.), Handbuch Heidelberger Katechismus (Gütersloh: Gütersloher Verlag, 2014), 275–283.
 Met John V. Fesko: ‘Die Bedeutung des Heidelberger Katechismus’, in: A. Huijgen e.a. (eds.), Handbuch Heidelberger Katechismus (Gütersloh: Güterloher Verlag, 2014), 347–355.
 Fesko, John V., Beyond Calvin. Union With Christ and Justification in Early Modern Reformed Theology (1517-1700) (Göttingen: Vandenhoeck & Ruprecht, 2012), Journal of Reformed Theology 8 (2014), 316–318.
 ‘The Theology of the Heidelberg Catechism’, in Lux Mundi 32/2 (2013), 40–43.
 ‘The Dynamic Character of Accommodated Revelation: the Metaphors of the Ladder and the Pilgrim’s Way’, in: Calvinus Clarissimus Theologus. Papers of the Tenth International Congress on Calvin Research, ed. by Herman J. Selderhuis,  [Reformed Historical Theology 18] Göttingen 2012, 326–336.
 Divine Accommodation in John Calvin's Theology. Analysis and Assessment, RHT 16, Göttingen 2011. 
 ‘Divine Accommodation and the Reality of Human Knowledge of God: The Example of Calvin's Commentary on the Moses Theophany (Exodus 33-34)’, in: Herman J. Selderhuis (ed.), Calvin: Saint or Sinner?,  SMHR 51, Tübingen 2010, 161–172.
 ‘Calvin and Prayer,’ in: Lux Mundi 28/4 (2009): 94–97.
 'Calvin's Reception in the Nineteenth Century', in: Herman J. Selderhuis (ed.), Calvin Handbook, Grand Rapids 2009, 486–496.
 ‘Calvinrezeption im 19. Jahrhundert’, in: Herman J. Selderhuis (ed.), Calvin Handbuch, Tübingen 2008, 480–490.
 ‘Receptie van Calvijn in de negentiende eeuw’, in: Herman J. Selderhuis (red.), Calvijn Handboek, Kampen 2008, 538–548.
 ‘Divine accommodation and divine transcendence in John Calvin’s theology’, in: H.J. Selderhuis (ed.), Calvinus sacrorum literarum interpres. Papers of the International Congress on Calvin Research, Reformed Historical Theology 5, Göttingen 2008, 119–130.

References

1978 births
Living people
Dutch Calvinist and Reformed theologians